Zodarion reticulatum is a spider species found in Cyprus.

See also 
 List of Zodariidae species

References

External links 

reticulatum
Spiders of Europe
Spiders described in 1908